The 16th Legislative Assembly of Puerto Rico will meet from January 2, 2009, to January 1, 2013. All members of the House of Representatives and the Senate were elected in the General Elections of 2008. The House and the Senate both have a majority of members from the New Progressive Party.

Leadership

Senate

House of Representatives

Changes in membership

Senate

House of Representatives

References

External links
Puerto Rico State Elections Commission 

Puerto Rico, 16th Legislative Assembly
16